Even Death May Die is the third EP by French death metal band Necrowretch. It was released on October 13, 2014 by Century Media Records on 7" vinyl limited to 500 copies, of which 400 were on black vinyl and 100 were on gold vinyl. The EP was slated as a "first taste" of Necrowretch's upcoming second studio album, With Serpents Scourge, which was released in February 2015.

Track listing

Personnel
Necrowretch
 Vlad – vocals, guitar
 Amphycion – bass
 Ilmar Marti Uibo – drums

Miscellaneous staff
 Milovan Novaković - artwork

References

2014 EPs
Necrowretch EPs